Afroempis is a genus of flies in the family Empididae.

Species
A. stuckenbergi Smith, 1969

References

Empidoidea genera
Empididae